Unearthed Arcana (abbreviated UA) is the title shared by two hardback books published for different editions of the Dungeons & Dragons fantasy role-playing game. Both were designed as supplements to the core rulebooks, containing material that expanded upon other rules.

The original Unearthed Arcana was written primarily by Gary Gygax, and published by game publisher TSR in 1985 for use with the Advanced Dungeons & Dragons first edition rules. The book consisted mostly of material previously published in magazines, and included new races, classes, and other material to expand the rules in the Dungeon Masters Guide and Players Handbook. The book was notorious for its considerable number of errors, and was received negatively by the gaming press whose criticisms targeted the over-powered races and classes, among other issues. Gygax intended to use the book's content for a planned second edition of Advanced Dungeons & Dragons; however, much of the book's content was not reused in the second edition, which went into development shortly after Gygax's departure from TSR.

A second book titled Unearthed Arcana was produced by Wizards of the Coast for Dungeons & Dragons third edition in 2004. The designers did not reproduce material from the original book, but instead attempted to emulate its purpose by providing variant rules and options to change the game itself.

The title Unearthed Arcana is also used for a regular series on the official Dungeons & Dragons website that presents new playtest content for Dungeons & Dragons fifth edition.

Advanced Dungeons & Dragons

Development history
The original Unearthed Arcana was written by Gary Gygax with design and editing contributions by Jeff Grubb and Kim Mohan, respectively, and published by TSR in 1985. Gygax reportedly produced the book to raise money as TSR was deeply in debt at the time. He announced in the March 1985 issue of Dragon magazine that Unearthed Arcana would be released in the summer of that year. He proposed the book as "an interim volume to expand the Dungeon Masters Guide and Players Handbook", as the information was spread out in several places and difficult to keep track of. Unearthed Arcana was to include material previously published in Dragon, written by Gygax and updated and revised for the book. The book would also contain previously unpublished material, some of it written by other contributors to Dragon. According to British writer Paul Cockburn, some of the material in Unearthed Arcana had been previously published in Imagine magazine.

The original Unearthed Arcana contains errors in its text, which readers discovered and reported to Dragon magazine. Even some positive reviews of the book pointed out the considerable number of mistakes. Dragon editor Kim Mohan, with ideas from Gygax, Frank Mentzer, and Jeff Grubb, addressed the many errors found in the book. In the November 1985 issue of Dragon magazine, Mohan printed four pages of rules corrections as well as new supplementary material intended to be inserted into the book, and some explanations and justifications for items which were not actually errors, and compiled a two-page list of type corrections meant to be pasted into further revisions of Unearthed Arcana. Dragon also devoted the entirety of its "Sage Advice" column in the January 1987 issue to answering readers' questions about Unearthed Arcana, as a follow-up to Mohan's prior column. However, the errata were not incorporated into later printings of the manual.

In 1999, a paperback reprint of the first edition was released.

The original Unearthed Arcana was reproduced in a premium edition with gilded pages, released on February 19, 2013, after the premium reprints of the 1st Edition Player's Handbook, Dungeon Masters Guide, and Monster Manual. This reprint is the first printing of the book to be modified with the errata previously published in Dragon magazine incorporated into the corrected text.

Contents

The 128-page Unearthed Arcana was written for use with the Advanced Dungeons & Dragons first edition rules and was divided into two sections: one for players and one for the Dungeon Master (or "DM", the game organizer). The book provided new races, classes, and other expansion material. The book gives details on using "subraces" of the standard races, such as dark elves (drow), and deep gnomes (svirfneblin), for use as player characters and non-player characters.

Unearthed Arcana includes the barbarian (found in Dragon #63), cavalier (found in Dragon #72), and thief-acrobat (found in Dragon #69) character classes, and also includes expansions and revisions of the druid and ranger classes. The book presents a large addition to the range of character races, including the drow and svirfneblin. The book includes new weapons, and revised information on character level maximums for non-human player characters. Unearthed Arcana details the weapon specialization rules, in which a fighter or ranger "can adopt a weapon as a special arm, and receive bonuses in its use". The book also describes the comeliness attribute, and contains new spells. The DM's section covers suggestions for handling player characters, social class and rank tables, many new magic items, weaponless combat rules, and nonhuman deities.

Advanced Dungeons & Dragons 2nd edition
By 1985, Gygax was planning a second edition for the Advanced Dungeons & Dragons (AD&D) rules, and intended beginning work on this in 1986.  He intended to incorporate material from Unearthed Arcana, Oriental Adventures, and the original Players Handbook into the new edition's Players Handbook. Gygax used the book to explore some ideas he had for the new edition, such as changing the mechanics for hit dice (the measurement of a character's "health" in the game), and altering the game's mechanics to allow the game system to work other genres, and to allow characters to have skills that complement the character classes. Shortly after announcing his intentions for second edition, Gygax was removed as TSR's president and chairman of the board. In 1986, he resigned all positions with TSR, leaving the shape and direction of the Dungeons & Dragons game to other designers.

The designers of second edition Advanced Dungeons & Dragons removed material from the original Players Handbook in the new edition, as well as much of the new material that had appeared in Unearthed Arcana, which they considered to be "unbalanced". The book had five printings after the release of AD&D 2nd edition with the last printing published two years after the new edition was released.

Dungeons & Dragons 3rd edition

The second book to use the name Unearthed Arcana was written by Andy Collins, Jesse Decker, David Noonan, and Rich Redman, and published in February 2004 by Wizards of the Coast, for use with the Dungeons & Dragons third edition rules. Cover art was by Matt Cavotta, with interior art by Steven Belledin, Ed Cox, Wayne England, Emily Fiegenschuh, David Hudnut, Jeremy Jarvis, Doug Kovacs, John and Laura Lakey, David Martin, Dennis Crabapple McClain, Mark Nelson, James Pavelec, Steve Prescott, David Roach, Richard Sardinha, Ron Spencer, Stephen Tappin, Joel Thomas, and Ben Thompson. 

The designers aimed the book at experienced players and DMs looking for something new, encouraging them to customize the game's rules. The designers did not want the third edition book to be like the original Unearthed Arcana mechanically, because according to Andy Collins: "Every book on the market looks like the original Unearthed Arcana. New classes, new spells, new magic items - that's the default "recipe" for a d20 product these days. We saw no need to do that with this book." Where the original Unearthed Arcana had simply expanded the rules and options of the core game, this 224-page supplement was aimed at providing an extensive list of variant rules and options to change the standard game itself. The volume of options added was intentionally excessive; according to the designers, a Dungeon Master who reads the book must be prepared to "Drink from the fire hose" and to think before using options that may radically imbalance the game. The book ends with a checklist of the included variants, preceded by a short chapter discussing ways of transitioning among multiple games using different rulesets (one of which explicitly emulates the "Eternal Champion" stories of Michael Moorcock).

Dungeons & Dragons 5th edition
The Unearthed Arcana title has been used for a semi-regular series of digital releases at the official D&D website that began in February 2015; the series presents new, work-in-progress content such as class archetypes, playable races, and rule variants, similar to the playtest process that preceded the release of 5th edition. Much of the information in Xanathar's Guide to Everything (2017) and Tasha's Cauldron of Everything (2020) was developed through the public Unearthed Arcana playtest. On the playtest subclasses developed for Tasha’s Cauldron of Everything, Jeremy Crawford said "almost every single one made it into the game". Starting in January 2018, Unearthed Arcana content was generally added to D&D Beyond approximately one week after it was released on the official D&D website. Once the playtest period has concluded for Unearthed Arcana content (whether it is published in a book or retired, as determined by Wizards of the Coast), it is archived on D&D Beyond; existing character sheets already using the content are able to continue doing so, but the archived playtest content can not be newly added to a character.

, Unearthed Arcana articles have featured One D&D playtest material with releases now exclusive to D&D Beyond.

List of Unearthed Arcana

Reception
Reaction to the Unearthed Arcana hardcover was often critical. According to Lawrence Schick, in his 1991 book Heroic Worlds, "Many players regard the new character classes introduced in this volume as overly powerful and out of line with those in the Player's Handbook."

Paul Cockburn reviewed the original Unearthed Arcana in issue 73 of White Dwarf magazine (January 1986), rating it 4 out of 10 overall. He summed up the book's contents by calling them "A rules extension package of reprints, most of which add very little of interest or value to anybody's game."

William B. Haddon's review of the third edition Unearthed Arcana on RPGnet lauded the book's content while criticizing the interest level of the content as "very flat". He found the power level unbalanced for each of the new sub-systems introduced, and found little in the suggested rules that he wanted to use.

Viktor Coble listed Unearthed Arcana as #10 on CBR's 2021 "D&D: 10 Best Supplemental Handbooks" list, stating that "If there is ever a supplemental guide to include in a player's library, it's any of the "Unearthed Arcana" editions. They're by far one of the most useful handbooks D&D ever puts out, and are rarely a regretted addition."

References

1985 books
2004 books
Books by Gary Gygax
Dungeons & Dragons sourcebooks
Role-playing game supplements introduced in 1985